Cretica Chronica or Kretika Chronika (Cretan annals) is a peer-reviewed academic journal published annually by the Society of Cretan Historical Studies on the history, archaeology, culture, and folklore of the island of Crete. The journal was established in 1947, and is published in Heraklion, Greece. The current editor-in-chief is Alexis Kalokerinos. Articles are published in English, French, German, Greek, or Italian.

Andreas G. Kalokerinos served as Chronica's editor-in-chief from its inception until 1973, for a total of 25 volumes. Two further volumes were published in 1986 and 1987 by Crete University Press, and two more in 1988–1990 by the Vikelaia Municipal Library of Heraklion, along with a volume of indices in 1994. The journal was revived in 2011, publishing one issue per year, with publication undertaken by the Society of Cretan Historical Studies.

References

External links 
  in English
 Digitized versions of the first 14 volumes, 1947–1960

Archaeology journals
Multilingual journals
Annual journals
Area studies journals
Publications established in 1947
1947 establishments in Greece
Crete